Devil's Bellows Pass is a mountain pass situated in the Eastern Cape province of South Africa on the regional road R351, between Fort Beaufort and Sada, Eastern Cape.

Mountain passes of the Eastern Cape